Heeia is a census-designated place comprising several neighborhoods located in the City & County of Honolulu and the Koolaupoko District on the island of Oahu north of Kāneohe. In Hawaiian the words hee ia mean "washed away", alluding to a victory achieved by the populace against others from leeward Oahu, aided by a tsunami that washed the combatants off the shore.

Heeia includes Haikū Valley and Heeia Kea.  The population was 5,001 at the 2020 census. The area is almost entirely one of homes and apartments.  Parts of Heeia lie along Kāneohe Bay, but public access is non-existent owing to private ownership of the property behind the shore.

Notable in the Heeia area are:
 Haikū Valley, a former United States Coast Guard radio transmitter site with the Haiku Stairs
 Site of the former receiving antenna tower for Station HYPO, the naval cryptanalytic station that did so much toward breaking Japanese naval codes in 1941-1942 that resulted in US victory in the Battle of Midway, seen by most historians as the turning point of the Pacific War. The site of their antenna was He'eia, NOT the site of Station HYPO itself. Station HYPO got its name from the phonetic for the letter "H", because of He'eia where its antenna was sited
 Heeia Fishpond, the largest remaining fishpond on Oahu

Heeia Kea is a community and small, undeveloped valley separated from Heeia by Heeia Marsh and Kealohi Point. Heeia Kea Small Boat Harbor, the only public pier and boat ramp on Kāneohe Bay, is found here. Several fishponds have been restored in recent years.  Although fishponds were developed on most of the islands, the largest concentrations were found in Keehi Lagoon, Pearl Harbor, and Kāneohe Bay on Oahu.

The U.S. ZIP code for Heeia and Heeia Kea is the same as for Kāneohe: 96744.

Geography 
Heeia is located at  (21.426200, -157.812248). Heeia is essentially part of Kāneohe, and the nearest town to the northwest is Āhuimanu, reached by either Kahekili Highway (State Rte. 83) or Kamehameha Highway (State Rte. 830) along the coast.

The total area is 7.54% water.

Demographics 

As of the census of 2000, there were 4,944 people, 1,557 households, and 1,367 families residing in the CDP. The racial makeup of the CDP was 25.67% White, 0.44% Black or African American, 0.14% Native American, 40.84% Asian, 8.52% Pacific Islander, 0.77% from other races, and 23.62% from two or more races. Hispanic or Latino of any race were 4.83% of the population.

There were 1,557 households, out of which 28.0% had children under the age of 18 living with them, 73.2% were married couples living together, 9.9% had a female householder with no husband present, and 12.2% were non-families. 9.2% of all households were made up of individuals, and 3.8% had someone living alone who was 65 years of age or older.  The average household size was 3.17 and the average family size was 3.32.

In the CDP the population was spread out, with 21.4% under the age of 18, 6.9% from 18 to 24, 24.4% from 25 to 44, 31.5% from 45 to 64, and 15.8% who were 65 years of age or older.  The median age was 43 years.  For every 100 females there were 98.9 males.  For every 100 females age 18 and over, there were 96.4 males.

The median income for a household in the CDP was $87,528, and the median income for a family was $90,435. Males had a median income of $55,179 versus $34,983 for females. The per capita income for the CDP was $33,990.  None of the families and 0.5% of the population were below the poverty line, including none of those under the age of 18 and none of those ages 65 and older.

Education
The Hawaii Department of Education operates the public schools.

Governor Samuel Wilder King Intermediate School is in the Heʻeia CDP.

Heʻeia Elementary School is in the adjacent Kaneohe CDP.

The Roman Catholic Diocese of Honolulu operates St. Ann Catholic School, K-8, in the Heʻeia CDP.

References

External links

He'eia Fishpond and Watershed

Census-designated places in Honolulu County, Hawaii
Populated coastal places in Hawaii